Bedir Khan is a surname. Notable people with the surname include:

 Bedir Khan Beg
 Emin Ali Bedir Khan
 Bedri Pasha Bedir Khan, Kurdish Ottoman politician
 Abdürrezzak Bedir Khan
 Leyla Bedir Khan
 Celadet Bedir Khan
 Kamuran Alî Bedirxan
 Süreyya Bedir Khan
 Wiam Simav Bedirxan
Ahmed Badrakhan